First National Bank Stadium or simply FNB Stadium, also known as Soccer City and The Calabash, is an association football (soccer) and Rugby union stadium located in Nasrec, bordering the Soweto area of Johannesburg, South Africa. The venue is managed by Stadium Management South Africa (SMSA) and is a home of Kaizer Chiefs F.C. in the South African Premier Soccer League as well as key fixtures for the South African national football team.

It is located next to the South African Football Association headquarters (SAFA House) where both the FIFA offices and the Local Organising Committee for the 2010 FIFA World Cup were housed. Designed as the main association football stadium for the World Cup, the FNB Stadium became the largest stadium in Africa with a capacity of 94,736. However, its maximum capacity during the 2010 FIFA World Cup was 84,490 due to reserved seating for the press and other VIPs. The stadium is also known by its nickname "The Calabash" due to its resemblance to the African pot or gourd.

It was the site of Nelson Mandela's first speech in Johannesburg after his release from prison in 1990, and served as the venue for a memorial service to him on 10 December 2013. It was also the site of Chris Hani's funeral. It was also the venue for the 2010 FIFA World Cup Final, which was played by the Netherlands and Spain. The World Cup closing ceremony on the day of the final saw the final public appearance of Mandela.

Naming history
The stadium has been officially known as FNB Stadium since it was opened in 1989. This was due to a naming rights deal with First National Bank. During the 2010 FIFA World Cup, as well as in the month before the tournament, the stadium was referred to as Soccer City. This was done as FIFA does not allow stadiums to be referred to by sponsored names during FIFA-sanctioned tournaments. The stadium's current name is FNB Stadium.

Construction
Built in 1987, the stadium underwent a major upgrade for the 2010 FIFA World Cup, with a new design inspired by the shape of an African pot, the calabash. The South African main contractor GLTA, part of the Aveng Group in a joint venture with the Dutch company BAM who had a 25% stake, constructed the upgrade, which was designed by HOK Sport (now known as Populous) and Boogertman + Partners. The upgrade included: an extended upper tier around the stadium to increase the capacity to 88,958, an additional two executive suites, an encircling roof, new changing room facilities and new floodlights. The number of suites in the stadium was increased to 195. Grinaker-LTA and BAM international won the R1.5 billion tender to upgrade the stadium. The construction was completed on Wednesday, 21 October 2009 and was marked by a huge celebration at the stadium.

Stadium design

The outside of the stadium is designed to have the appearance of an African pot; the cladding on the outside is a mosaic of fire and earthen colours with a ring of lights running around the bottom of the structure, simulating fire underneath the pot. No spectator is seated more than 100 metres (330 ft) from the field, and there are no restricted views in the stadium.

The stands in the FNB Stadium are articulated by ten black vertical lines; nine are aligned geographically with the nine other stadiums involved in the 2010 World Cup. Because 9 is considered to be an unlucky number in South African traditional culture, a tenth line was added. This tenth line is aimed at Berlin's Olympic Stadium, which hosted the previous World Cup final in 2006. This represents the road to the final and it is hoped that after the World Cup, each goal scored at the stadium will be placed in pre-cast concrete panels on a podium so that the full history of the tournament's scores can be seen for years to come.

Before the upgrade

Before the upgrade, the stadium had a capacity of 40,000. The newly reconstructed stadium retains part of the original structure's west upper tier, although this and the entire lower tier were rebuilt to improve sightlines. The lower tier was completely reconstructed and divided into two segments which enabled the creation of a new lower concourse (the lower embankment concourse) linked to the existing ground level concourse.

Major tournaments

1996 African Cup of Nations
FNB Stadium served as the main venue for the tournament. It hosted the opening game, 5 other group games, a quarter final, a semi final, the 3rd place play-off and the final. The games were:

2010 FIFA World Cup
The stadium hosted the opening ceremony followed by the opening match between South Africa and Mexico, 4 other group stage matches, a Round of 16 match, a quarter-final and the final.

2013 African Cup of Nations
FNB Stadium served as a venue for the tournament. It hosted the opening game, one group game and the final. The games were:

.

Football

International football
FNB stadium has been used by the South African national football team for both friendlies and qualification matches. It was seen as the de facto national stadium for Bafana Bafana after re-admission in 1992, who played their third ever international match there on 11 July 1992 where they drew 2–2 with Cameroon courtesy of goals from Phil and Bennett Masinga for South Africa in front of 65,000 supporters. The "old" FNB Stadium also housed the then South African Football Association (SAFA) headquarters as well as the offices of the semi-professional National Soccer League (which later traded as the professional Premier Soccer League).

The stadium has also hosted large continental club fixtures. It is largely remembered as the venue where Bafana Bafana lifted the 1996 Africa Cup of Nations when they beat Tunisia 2–0 in front of a full capacity in a match witnessed by then South African president, Nelson Mandela, his then deputy president and former South African State President, FW de Klerk, as well as Zulu monarch, King Zwelithini. The South African national football team also won their first ever trophy here when they lifted the Simba Four Nations Cup in 1995, in a competition featuring Egypt, Zambia and Zimbabwe.

The venue for the first leg of the 1995 African Cup of Champions Clubs final, between Orlando Pirates and ASEC Abidjan. The stadium has also hosted the CAF Super Cup twice. It hosted the 1994 CAF Super Cup, between Zamalek and Al-Ahly, as well as the 1996 CAF Super Cup between Orlando Pirates and JS Kabylie. In 2004, the stadium hosted final of the Vodacom Challenge, between AS Vita Club and Kaizer Chiefs.

Some of the most memorable Bafana Bafana matches at the venue include the narrow 3–2 defeat to Brazil in 1996 as well as the country's memorable triumph when they secured passage through to a first ever World Cup appearance for the 1998 FIFA World Cup in France when they beat Republic of Congo 1-0 through a Phil Masinga strike in 1997.

During the 2010 FIFA World Cup, one of the most entertaining matches was played here in the quarterfinal stages when Uruguay beat Ghana in a penalty shootout made more memorable by a blatant handball in the last minute of the extra time by Uruguay striker Luis Suárez, which denied a Ghana and Africa a first ever semifinal appearance at the world football showpiece.

Local football
The FNB Stadium is home to Kaizer Chiefs Football Club. It is also the preferred venue for the Soweto derby soccer matches – the country's biggest sporting showpiece – involving Soweto based Premier Soccer League clubs, Kaizer Chiefs and Orlando Pirates. It was also the traditional home of the Iwisa Maize Meal Spectacular and later, the Telkom Charity Cup, which were charity soccer season openers in South African football from 1990 to 2006, before it was closed for renovations. The stadium was re-opened when it hosted the 2010 Nedbank Cup final between Bidvest Wits and Amazulu. The game ending 3–0 to Bidvest Wits. Fabricio Rodrigues was the first player to score at the rebuilt Soccer City. The Charity Cup then returned in 2010. The first league match at the stadium since being rebuilt, was a 2010–11 Premier Soccer League match between Orlando Pirates and Free State Stars. The first MTN 8 match at the stadium was the first leg of the 2010 MTN 8 semifinal, between Orlando Pirates and Kaizer Chiefs. The venue has also hosted high-profile Bafana Bafana matches, including their 1–0 win over Spain in 2013 as well as the side's worst ever defeat when they lost 5–0 to Brazil in another international friendly in 2014.

In May 2018, Mamelodi Sundowns hosted FC Barcelona in an exhibition match, dedicated to the late Former President of South Africa in his centenary. The match ended 31 in the favour of Barcelona.

Rugby
FNB stadium is a multi-purpose venue and hosted its first rugby union match in 2010, the Tri Nations match between South Africa and New Zealand, won by the latter. The attendance was 94,713 which is listed as the third highest rugby attendance ever in the Southern Hemisphere and a record attendance for the redeveloped stadium, until it was eclipsed on 1 August 2015, when 94,807 was recorded when Orlando Pirates played Kaizer Chiefs in the Carling Black Label Cup fixture. The stadium hosted New Zealand again in the 2012 Rugby Championship on 6 October, with the All Blacks defeating the Springboks 32–16 in front of 88,739. In 2013, the Springboks defeated Argentina 73–13 at FNB Stadium in front of a crowd 52,867. In 2016, the venue hosted Varsity Cup rugby fixtures.

Concerts

A The Coldplay concert was a rehearsal concert in preparation for their Mylo Xyloto Tour. As part of the concert, they filmed scenes for the music video for their song "Paradise".

B Ed Sheeran, Chris Martin, Pharrell Williams, Usher, and others also performed during the festival headlined by Beyoncé & Jay Z.

Christian gatherings

Incidents 
On 29 July 2017, two people were killed and 17 were injured in a stadium crush while trying to enter the stadium before a match between the Kaizer Chiefs and Orlando Pirates.

See also
 1996 African Cup of Nations
 2010 FIFA World Cup
 2013 African Cup of Nations

References

External links

 Soccer City – Official stadium info
 Soccer City at the 2010 Communication Project
 FIFA 2010 sponsorship at FNB
 Soccer City Stadium: a case study on Constructalia 
 Soccer City ESPN Profile
 360 View
 Soccer City documentary film
 Pictures and Videos from Soccer City
 Stadium Management South Africa
Photos of Soccer City Stadium at cafe.daum.net/stade

1989 establishments in South Africa
2010 FIFA World Cup stadiums
Human stampedes in 2017
Man-made disasters in South Africa
Music venues in South Africa
South Africa
Rugby union stadiums in South Africa
Soccer venues in South Africa
Sports venues completed in 1989
Sports venues in Johannesburg
Stadiums that have hosted a FIFA World Cup opening match